Ethnic and place names are often used as derisive adjectives.

Most of these derisive adjectives reflect stereotypes about the ethnicity or the place. Most are pejorative and some are offensive.

African dominoesDice.
African golfCraps.
Arizona cloudburstA sandstorm.
Arizona paint jobAn unpainted, weathered pine building.
Arkansas asphaltA road made of logs.
Arkansas fire extinguisherA chamberpot.
Arkansas toothpickA knife with an extra-legal blade.
Aztec hopDysentary or diarrhea.
Baltimore beef steakLiver.
Boston strawberriesBeans.
Bronx cheer.
California Bible= California prayer book.
California bank notesSilver and hides used as money.
California breakfastA cigarette and an orange.
California prayer bookA deck of cards.
California toothpick= Arkansas toothpick.
Cape Ann turkey= Cape Cod turkey
Cape Cod turkeyCodfish.
Chicago overcoatcement shoes or a coffin.
Chicago pianoA Thompson submachine gun.
Chinaman's chanceNo chance at all.
Chinese fire drill
Chinese BA grade inflated to compensate for a student's disadvantage.
Cincinnati quail= Confederate beef.
Colored peoples'/folks' timeLate.
Confederate beef/muleFatty salt pork.
Connecticut mileThe distance traveled in one minute.
Curse of Montezuma= Aztec hop.
Dago redCheap red wine.
Dallas special= Arkansas toothpick.
Detroit ironAn American car.
Detroit sled= Detroit iron.
Dutch actSuicide.
Dutch courageCourage from drunkenness.
Dutch leave= French leave.
Dutch rubA kind of torture between children.
Dutch treat
Dutch uncleAn affectionate, older friend, remotely related person, or someone who reprimands severely.
Ethiopian paradise= Nigger heaven
French inhaleExhaling smoke from the mouth and then inhaling it through the nose.
French kiss
French leave
Haight Street breakfastMuscatel and Wheaties.
Indian giver
Indian haircutA scalping.
Irish banjoA shovel.
Irish confettiBricks and cobblestones thrown during street fights.
Irish pendants/pennantsRags or laundry hung up to dry on board ship.
Irish shift/switchDescribes a politician talking to one person with his arm around another, smiling all the while at a third.
Irish twinsSiblings born within the same calendar year, or within twelve months of each other.
Irishman's buggyA wheelbarrow.
Irishman's turkeyCorned beef and cabbage.
Jew flagA dollar bill.
Jew shaveAn unshaven face covered with talcum powder.
Jewish overdrive= Mexican overdrive.
Jewish side-walls= Mexican side-walls
Jewish timeLate.
Jewish windbreakerA mink coat.
Jigaboo joy shopA store which sells chrome accessories for automobiles.
Kansas niggerAn African-American who does not defer to whites.
Kentucky credit card= Mexican credit card.
Kentucky oysters= Rocky Mountain oysters.
Kentucky windageCompensating for wind or misaligned rifle sights by aiming off target.
Mahon sogerA lazy and worthless sailor.
Mexican standoff
Mexican Bogner'sJeans worn as ski pants.
Mexican breakfastA cigarette and a glass of water.
Mexican car washLeaving an automobile out in the rain.
Mexican cashmereA sweatshirt.
Mexican chromeSilver-color paint used to decorate a car.
Mexican credit cardA siphon for stealing gasoline.
Mexican draglineA shovel.
Mexican filling station= Mexican credit card.
Mexican fox-trot= Aztec hop.
Mexican motor mountInner tubing used instead of proper parts.
Mexican mufflerA can stuffed with steel wool on an exhaust pipe.
Mexican nose guardJockstrap.
Mexican overdriveDriving downhill in neutral.
Mexican promotionAn increase in rank or title without a pay raise.
Mexican side-wallsPainted tires.
Mexican straightIn poker, any five cards and a sharp knife.
Mexican threadsA stripped bolt forced into a hole to cut new threads.
Mexican toothache= Aztec hop.
Mexican two-step= Aztec hop.
Mexican valve jobCleaning a carburetor with kerosene.
Mexican window shadeA Venetian blind mounted in the rear window of a car.
Milwaukee goiterA beer belly.
Mississippi marblesDice.
Montezuma's revenge= Aztec hop.
Mountain dewMoonshine.
Mountain oysters= Rocky Mountain oysters.
Nigger bait(Excess) chrome on an automobile.
Nigger fishingFishing for low-value fish with a pole and bobber.
Nigger heavenThe cheapest balcony seats in a theater.
Nigger richEither rich and ostentatious or rich one day, poor the next.
Oklahoma credit card= Mexican credit card.
Oklahoma guaranteeNo guarantee.
Oklahoma showupA falsified police line-up.
Oregon beefDeer killed out of season.
Pennsylvania salve Apple butter.
Philadelphia lawyerA crooked lawyer.
Polish air conditioningDriving with the windows down.
Prairie coalCow dung used as fuel.
Prairie oysters= Rocky Mountain oysters
Puerto Rico PendletonAn old work shirt.
Rocky Mountain oysters
Rocky Mountain canaryA burro.
Russian roulette
Scotch mistDense mist-like rain.
Scotch woodcock
Scotsman's ZooA viewpoint from which a zoo can be seen without paying.
Spanish fluThe 1918 pandemic flu. It was associated to Spain since, in other countries, the World War I censorship blocked local reports to preserve morale. 
Spanish supperTightening of the belt a notch instead of eating.
Swedish headachePain from sexual arousal without sexual release (cf. Blue balls).
Texas butterGravy made from bacon grease, flour, and water.
Texas oystersRocky Mountain oysters
Texas squirrelsPrairie dogs used as food.
Tijuana BiblePornographic comic books.
Vatican rouletteCalendar-based contraceptive methods.
Welsh rabbit
West Indian Time Late.

Notes

Lists of phrases